The Kowloon Tong School (Secondary Section)  (abbr.: KTSSS; Chinese: 九龍塘學校(中學部))  is one of Hong Kong's co-educational secondary schools located at 10 Surrey Lane, Kowloon Tong, Kowloon, Hong Kong. Founded in 1962, it was a private English Language School. It was changed to a co-educational aided secondary school in 1978.

The school is not a "Through-train" School that links with the Kowloon Tong School (Primary Section).

References

Secondary schools in Hong Kong
Kowloon City District